The Tunnel du Bois Clair is a  former railway tunnel near Cluny, France, that is now the longest cycling tunnel of Europe, as part of a voie verte (cycle path / greenway), the Voie Verte de Bourgogne du Sud.

The tunnel is closed during the winter months (mid-October through the end of March) to protect a colony of bats that live in the tunnel. The tunnel takes about 7 minutes to travel through by bike and around 20 minutes by foot.

References 

Tunnels in France

Cycling tunnels